Gregory Oliver Hines (February 14, 1946 – August 9, 2003) was an American dancer, actor, choreographer, and singer. He is one of the most celebrated tap dancers of all time. As an actor, he is best known for Wolfen (1981), The Cotton Club (1984), White Nights (1985), Running Scared (1986), The Gregory Hines Show (1997–1998), playing Ben on Will & Grace (1999–2000), and for voicing Big Bill on the Nick Jr. animated children's television program Little Bill (1999–2004).

Hines starred in more than 40 films and also appeared on Broadway. He received many accolades, including a Daytime Emmy Award, a Drama Desk Award, and a Tony Award, as well as nominations for a Screen Actors Guild Award and four Primetime Emmy Awards.

Early life
Hines was born in New York City, on February 14, 1946, to Alma Iola (Lawless) and Maurice Robert Hines, a dancer, musician, and actor, and grew up in the Sugar Hill neighborhood of Harlem. He began tap dancing when he was two years old, and began dancing semi-professionally at age five. After that, he and his older brother Maurice performed together, studying with choreographer Henry LeTang.

Gregory and Maurice also studied with veteran tap dancers such as Howard Sims and The Nicholas Brothers when they performed at the same venues. The brothers were known as The Hines Kids, making nightclub appearances at venues in Miami, Florida, with Cab Calloway. They were later known as The Hines Brothers.

When their father joined the act as a drummer, their name changed again in 1963 to Hines, Hines, and Dad.

Career

Tap dance
Hines was an avid improviser of tap steps, tap sounds, and tap rhythms alike. His improvisation was like that of a drummer, doing a solo and coming up with rhythms. He also improvised the phrasing of a number of tap steps, mainly based on sound produced. A laid-back dancer, he usually wore loose fitting pants and a tighter shirt.

Although he inherited the roots and tradition of the black rhythmic tap, he also promoted the new black rhythmic tap. "He purposely obliterated the tempos," wrote tap historian Sally Sommer, "throwing down a cascade of taps like pebbles tossed across the floor. In that moment, he aligned tap with the latest free form experiments in jazz and new music and postmodern dance."

Throughout his career, Hines wanted and continued to be an advocate for tap in America. He successfully petitioned the creation of National Tap Dance Day in May 1989, which is now celebrated in forty cities in the United States, as well as eight other nations. He was on the board of directors of Manhattan Tap, a member of the Jazz Tap Ensemble, and a member of the American Tap Dance Foundation, which was formerly called the American Tap Dance Orchestra.

In 1989, he created and hosted a PBS special called "Gregory Hines' Tap Dance in America," which featured various tap dancers such as Savion Glover and Bunny Briggs.

In 1990, Hines visited his idol (and Tap co-star) Sammy Davis Jr., who was dying of throat cancer and was unable to speak. After Davis died, an emotional Hines spoke at Davis's funeral of how Sammy made a gesture to him, "as if passing a basketball ... and I caught it." Hines spoke of the honor that Sammy thought that Hines could carry on from where he left off.

Through his teaching, he influenced tap dancers such as Savion Glover, Dianne Walker, Ted Levy, and Jane Goldberg. In an interview with The New York Times in 1988, Hines said that everything he did was influenced by his dancing: "my singing, my acting, my lovemaking, my being a parent."

Stage acting
Hines made his Broadway debut with his brother in The Girl in Pink Tights in 1954. He earned Tony Award nominations for Eubie! (1979), Comin' Uptown (1980), and Sophisticated Ladies (1981), and won the Tony Award and Drama Desk Award for Jelly's Last Jam (1992) and the Theatre World Award for Eubie!.

Music
Hines performed as the lead singer and musician in a rock band called Severance based in Venice, Los Angeles in 1975 and 1976. Severance was one of the house bands at an original music club called Honky Hoagies Handy Hangout, otherwise known as the 4H Club. Severance released their self-titled debut album on Largo Records (a subsidiary of GNP Crescendo) in 1976.

In 1986, he sang a duet with Luther Vandross called "There's Nothing Better Than Love", which reached the No. 1 position on the Billboard R&B charts. Encouraged by his first success on the chart, Hines subsequently released his self-titled debut album on Epic in 1988 with much support of Vandross. This album produced a Vandross-penned single "That Girl Wants to Dance with Me", which peaked at #8 on the Billboard Hot 100 in May 1988.

Film and television
In 1981, Hines made his movie debut in Mel Brooks's History of the World, Part I, replacing Richard Pryor, who was originally cast in the role but suffered severe burns in a house fire just days before he was due to begin shooting. Madeline Kahn, also starring in the film, suggested to director Mel Brooks that he look into Hines for the role after they learned of Pryor's hospitalization. He appeared in the horror film Wolfen later that year.

Hines's peak as an actor came in the mid-1980s. He had a large role in The Cotton Club (1984), where he and his brother Maurice (in Maurice's sole film credit) played a 1930s tap-dancing duo reminiscent of the Nicholas Brothers. Hines co-starred with Mikhail Baryshnikov in the 1985 film White Nights, and co-starred with Billy Crystal in the 1986 buddy cop film Running Scared. He starred in the 1989 film Tap opposite Sammy Davis Jr. (in Davis's last screen performance). He appeared alongside Whitney Houston and Loretta Devine in the highly successful 1995 film Waiting to Exhale and opposite Houston, Denzel Washington and Courtney B. Vance the following year in The Preacher's Wife. On television, he starred in his own sitcom in 1997, The Gregory Hines Show, which ran for one season on CBS, and had a recurring role of Ben Doucette on Will & Grace.

In an interview in 1987, Hines said that he often looked for roles written for white actors, "preferring their greater scope and dynamics." Of his role in Running Scared, for example, he said that he enjoyed that his character had sex scenes, because "usually, the black guy has no sexuality at all."

Hines starred in the 1998 film The Tic Code. He voiced Big Bill in the Nick Jr. animated children series Little Bill, which ran from 1999 to 2004. He won the Daytime Emmy Award for Outstanding Performer in an Animated Program for the role in 2003.

Other
Hines co-hosted the Tony Awards ceremony in 1995 and 2002.

Personal life
Hines's marriages to Patricia Panella and Pamela Koslow ended in divorce. He had two children and a stepdaughter.

Death
Hines died of liver cancer on August 9, 2003 en route to the hospital from his home in Los Angeles. He was diagnosed with the disease more than one year earlier, but informed only his closest friends. At the time of his death, production of the television show Little Bill was ending, and he was engaged to bodybuilder Negrita Jayde, who was based in Toronto.

His funeral was held at St. Monica Catholic Church in Santa Monica, California. He was buried at St. Volodymyr Ukrainian Catholic Cemetery in Oakville, Ontario.

Legacy 
On January 28, 2019, the United States Postal Service honored Hines with a postage stamp as part of its Black Heritage Series. It was issued with a ceremony at the Buffalo Academy for Visual and Performing Arts.

Awards and nominations
Awards
1979 Theatre World Award – Eubie!
1988 Image Awards Outstanding Lead Actor in a Motion Picture – Running Scared
1992 Tony Award for Best Actor in a Musical – Jelly's Last Jam
1992 Drama Desk Award Outstanding Actor in a Musical – Jelly's Last Jam
1998 Flo-Bert Award – Lifetime Achievement in Tap Dance by the New York Committee to Celebrate National Tap Dance Day
2002 Image Awards Outstanding Actor in a Television Movie, Mini Series or Dramatic Special – Bojangles
2003 Emmy Award for Outstanding Performer in an Animated Program – Little Bill

Nominations
 1979 Tony Award for Best Featured Actor in a Musical—Eubie!
 1980 Tony Award for Best Actor in a Musical—Comin' Uptown
 1981 Tony Award for Best Actor in a Musical—Sophisticated Ladies
1982 Emmy Award for Outstanding Individual Achievement—Special Class—I Love Liberty
1985 Emmy Award for Outstanding Individual Performance in a Variety or Music Program—Motown Returns to the Apollo
1989 Emmy Award for Outstanding Variety, Music or Comedy Program—Great Performances: Tap Dance in America 
 1992 Drama Desk Award Outstanding Choreography—Jelly's Last Jam
 1992 Tony Award for Best Choreography—Jelly's Last Jam
 1995 Image Awards Outstanding Lead Actor in a Motion Picture—Waiting to Exhale
 1998 American Comedy Awards Funniest Male Guest Appearance in a TV Series—Will & Grace
 1998 Image Awards Outstanding Lead Actor in a Comedy Series—The Gregory Hines Show
 2001 Black Reel Awards Network/Cable Best Actor—Bojangles
 2001 Emmy Award for Outstanding Lead Actor in a Miniseries or a Movie—Bojangles
 2001 Screen Actors Guild Award for Outstanding Performance by a Male Actor in a Television Movie or Miniseries—Bojangles
 2003 Emmy Award for Outstanding Performer in a Children's Special—The Red Sneakers
 2003 Emmy Award for Outstanding Directing in a Children's Special—The Red Sneakers

Filmography

Finian's Rainbow (1968) – Child Extra
History of the World, Part I (1981) – Josephus
Wolfen (1981) – Coroner Whittington
Deal of the Century (1983) – Ray Kasternak
The Muppets Take Manhattan (1984) – Roller Skater
The Cotton Club (1984) – 'Sandman' Williams
White Nights (1985) – Raymond Greenwood
Faerie Tale Theatre: "Puss in Boots" (1985) – Edgar
Amazing Stories: (TV) "The Amazing Falsworth" (1985) – Falsworth
About Tap (1985) – Himself
Running Scared (1986) – Detective Ray Hughes
Off Limits (1988) – Albaby Perkins
Tap (1989) – Max Washington
Gregory Hines' Saigon (1987) – Himself
Gregory Hines' Tap Dance in America (1989) – Himself
Eve of Destruction (1991) – Colonel Jim McQuade
A Rage in Harlem (1991) – 'Goldy'
White Lie (1991) – Len Madison Jr.
T Bone N Weasel (1992) – 'T-Bone'
Dead Air (1994) – Mark Jannek / Jim Sheppard
Renaissance Man (1994) – Sergeant Cass
Kangaroo Court (1994)
Happily Ever After: Fairy Tales for Every Child (1995, Episode "Beauty and the Beast") – The Beast / Prince Koro (voice)
A Stranger in Town (1995) – Barnes
Waiting to Exhale (1995) – Marvin King
Good Luck (1996) – Bernard 'Bern' Lemley
Mad Dog Time (1996) – Jules Flamingo
The Preacher's Wife (1996) – Joe Hamilton
The Cherokee Kid (1996) – Jedediah Turner / The Undertaker
Subway Stories: Tales From the Underground (1997) – Jack (segment "Manhattan Miracle")
The Gregory Hines Show (1997 to 1998) – Ben Stevenson
Blue's Clues (1999, Episode Blue's Big Treasure Hunt) – Jack
The Tic Code (1999) – Tyrone Pike
Will & Grace (TV) (1999 to 2000) – Ben Doucette
Things You Can Tell Just by Looking at Her (2000) – Robert (segment "Fantasies About Rebecca")
Who Killed Atlanta's Children? (TV) (2000) – Ron Larson
Once in the Life (2000) – Ruffhouse
Bojangles (2001) – Bojangles
Venice: Lost and Found (2002) – Himself
The Red Sneakers (TV) (2002) – Zeke
Law & Order: (TV) "Suicide Box" (2003) – Carl Helpert
Lost at Home: (TV) (2003) – Jordan King
The Root (2003)
Little Bill (TV) (1999 to 2004, until his death) – Bill 'Big Bill' (final television appearance)
Keeping Time: The Life, Music & Photography of Milt Hinton (2004) – Himself
Love That Girl, Sally (2004) – Fred (final film role; dedicated production)

See also
 List of dancers

References

External links
 
 
 
 Blog of Death obituary
 Tapping into history Deborah Jowitt, Village Voice, August 2003.
 TonyAwards.com Interview with Gregory Hines
Archival footage of Gregory Hines, Dianne Walker and Jimmy Slyde in 1996 at Jacob's Pillow

1946 births
2003 deaths
20th-century American male actors
20th-century American singers
African-American choreographers
African-American educators
African-American male actors
African-American male child actors
African-American male dancers
African-American male singers
American choreographers
American male child actors
American male dancers
American male film actors
American male musical theatre actors
American male singers
American male stage actors
American male television actors
American tap dancers
Burials in Ontario
Dance teachers
Daytime Emmy Award winners
Deaths from cancer in California
Deaths from liver cancer
Drama Desk Award winners
Educators from New York City
Male actors from New York City
People from Harlem
Singers from New York City
Theatre World Award winners
Tony Award winners